Neka svemir čuje nemir (trans. May the Universe Hear the Unrest) is a double and the first live album by Serbian and former Yugoslav rock band Bajaga i Instruktori, released in 1989.

The first five tracks on the album are studio tracks. "Na vrhovima prstiju", "Idem (Kao da ne idem, a idem)" and "Neka svemir čuje nemir" made their debut on the album, and "Tekila - Gerila" and "Tamara" are acoustic versions of the songs from the album  Pozitivna geografija.

One part of the live tracks was recorded on March 6, 1989, on the band's concert in Dom Sportova in Zagreb. the other part was recorded on September 15, 1989, on the band's performance at EBU Rock Festival in Novi Sad. The last track of the album is the recording of the journalist Dražen Vrdoljak announcing the band on their concert in Kulušić club in Zagreb, held on December 8, 1984.

The album features a live version of the song "Kad hodaš", originally recorded by Momčilo Bajagić's former band Riblja Čorba.

Track listing
All tracks written by Momčilo Bajagić except where noted.

Disc One
"Na vrhovima prstiju"
"Tekila - Gerila"
"Idem (Kao da ne idem, a idem)" (Ž. Milenković, M. Bajagić)
"Tamara"
"Neka svemir čuje nemir" (Indian traditional, M. Bajagić)
"Dvadeseti vek"
"Dobro jutro, džezeri"
"220 u voltima"
"Plavi safir"

Disc Two
"Kad hodaš"
"Ruski voz" (Ž. Milenković, M. Bajagić)
"Zažmuri"
"Poljubi me"
"Limene trube"
"Ja mislim 300 na sat"
"Tišina"
"220 u voltima"
"Tonski zapis sa koncerta u Kulušiću 8.12.'84."

Personnel
Momčilo Bajagić - vocals, guitar, acoustic guitar, arranged by
Žika Milenković - vocals, arranged by
Miroslav Cvetković - bass guitar, backing vocals, arranged by
Saša Lokner - keyboards, backing vocals, arranged by
Nenad Stamatović - guitar, backing vocals
Vladimir Golubović - drums, backing vocals, arranged by

Additional personnel
Saša Habić - producer
Ivan Vlatković - producer ("220 u voltima" and "Tišina" only), recorded by
Mladen Škalec - recorded by
Milovan Macanović - recorded by ("220 u voltima" and "Tišina" only)
Petar Bojmić - engineer
Đorđe Petrović - engineer (on "220 u voltima" and "Tišina" only)
Zoran Vujkević - mixed by
Jan Šaš - mixed by ("220 u voltima" and "Tišina" only)

References 

Neka svemir čuje nemir at Discogs
 EX YU ROCK enciklopedija 1960-2006,  Janjatović Petar;

External links 
Neka svemir čuje nemir at Discogs

Bajaga i Instruktori live albums
1989 live albums
PGP-RTB live albums